Voslapp Rear Range Light is an active lighthouse and range light in Voslapp, state of Lower Saxony, Germany. At a height of  it is the twenty-second tallest "traditional lighthouse" in the world.

The lamp used is a 250 W lamp.

The Voslapp Range Lights replaced a single lighthouse which was built in 1907.

The site is open, but the tower is closed to the public.

See also 

 List of lighthouses and lightvessels in Germany
 List of tallest lighthouses in the world

References 

 
 
 

Lighthouses completed in 1962
Lighthouses in Lower Saxony